Abrud is a town in the north-western part of Alba County, Transylvania, Romania.

Abrud may also refer to:

Places

Romania
 Abrud, a village in Adamclisi Commune, Constanța County
 Abrud (river), river in the Apuseni Mountains, Alba County

Iran
 Abrud, Gilan
 Abrud, Davarzan, Razavi Khorasan Province
 Abrud, Torbat-e Heydarieh, Razavi Khorasan Province